USS Marabout (AMc-50) was an Accentor-class coastal minesweeper acquired by the U.S. Navy for the dangerous task of removing mines from minefields laid in the water to prevent ships from passing.

Marabout was laid down 20 December 1940 by the Herreshoff Mfg. Co., Bristol, Rhode Island; launched 17 February 1941; sponsored by Mrs. R. F. Haffenreffer; and commissioned 8 July 1941.

World War II service 
 
Following shakedown off the mid Atlantic seaboard, Marabout was assigned to the 1st Naval District at Boston, Massachusetts. On 9 December, two days after the United States entered World War II, she sailed for Bermuda to help combat German U-boats in the western Atlantic Ocean.

German subs plant mines on U.S. East Coast 
 
In May 1942, the U-boats began laying mines off the Atlantic coasts. Starting 14 May at St. Johns, Newfoundland, these activities threatened merchantmen as far as St. Lucia in the West Indies. Marabout, a coastal minesweeper, had the mission of ensuring safe passage to Allied shipping through the entrances of the ports.

Reassigned to the 5th Naval District 
 
Joining ServRon 5 in the fall, she supported units of the Fleet Operation Training Command, in particular task group TG 23.1, until ordered to New London, Connecticut, 7 November 1944, for duty under ComSubLant. There, for the next year and a half, she performed widely varied duties including radar jamming and sonar operations with other Naval and Coast Guard units in the area and at the Submarine School.

Deactivation 
 
On 16 May 1946, she steamed for Boston, where she decommissioned on 29 May. Transferred to the Maritime Commission for disposal, she was sold to the City of Boston, 31 July for service as a fireboat.

References

External links 
 Dictionary of American Naval Fighting Ships
 NavSource Online: Mine Warfare Vessel Photo Archive - Marabout (AMc 50)

1941 ships
Accentor-class minesweepers
Ships built in Bristol, Rhode Island
World War II minesweepers of the United States